Youxin (Mandarin: 又新镇 ) is a town in Jintang County, Chengdu, Sichuan, China. In 2010, Youxin had a total population of 24,786: 12,555 males and 12,231 females: 5,663 aged under 14, 15,760 aged between 15 and 65 and 3,363 aged over 65.

References 

Towns in Sichuan
Geography of Chengdu